North Tipperary was a UK Parliament constituency in Ireland, returning one Member of Parliament from 1885 to 1922. Prior to the 1885 United Kingdom general election the area was part of the Tipperary (UK Parliament constituency). From 1922, on the establishment of the Irish Free State, it was not represented in the UK Parliament.

Boundaries
This constituency comprised the northern part of County Tipperary.

1885–1922: The baronies of Ormond Lower, Ormond Upper, and Owney and Arra, and that part of the barony of Kilnamanagh Upper contained within the parishes of Glenkeen and Upperchurch.

Members of Parliament

Elections

Elections in the 1880s

Elections in the 1890s

Elections in the 1900s

Elections in the 1910s

Esmonde's death causes a by-election, in which three nationalists contested each other.

References

The Parliaments of England by Henry Stooks Smith (1st edition published in three volumes 1844–50), 2nd edition edited (in one volume) by F.W.S. Craig (Political Reference Publications 1973)

Westminster constituencies in County Tipperary (historic)
Dáil constituencies in the Republic of Ireland (historic)
Constituencies of the Parliament of the United Kingdom established in 1885
Constituencies of the Parliament of the United Kingdom disestablished in 1922